Michael J. Goodfellow  (October 3, 1866 – February 12, 1920) was a Major League Baseball outfielder. He appeared in one game for the 1887 St. Louis Browns and 68 games for the 1888 Cleveland Blues.

External links

1866 births
1920 deaths
Major League Baseball outfielders
St. Louis Browns (AA) players
Cleveland Blues (1887–88) players
19th-century baseball players
Detroit Wolverines (minor league) players
Baseball players from New York (state)
People from Port Jervis, New York